Nasrollah Nasehpour (was born 1940 in Ardabil) is an Iranian-Azerbaijani master musician in the Radif instrument.   Now Nasehpour is member of Iranian House music and professor in the Tehran University of Art.

References

External links
 Homepage at the nassehpour website

20th-century Iranian male singers
1940 births
People from Ardabil
Living people
21st-century Iranian musicians
Academic staff of Tehran University of Art